La Clede is an unincorporated community in La Clede Township, Fayette County, Illinois, United States.

The community was named after Pierre Laclède, a French fur trader.

Demographics

References

Unincorporated communities in Fayette County, Illinois
Unincorporated communities in Illinois